Brian Boru's March is a traditional Irish tune.

Brian Boru was a High King of Ireland who founded the O'Brien dynasty.

In 1969, the song was recorded by The Chieftains.
Horslips used it in 1976, as the intro and basis for "Trouble (With a Capital T)" from the album The Book of Invasions.

References

External links
 Sheet music
 Lyrics as given by Patrick Joseph McCall

Irish folk music
Year of song unknown
Songwriter unknown